Chhatrapati is a royal title from Sanskrit language. The word ‘Chhatrapati’ is a  Sanskrit language compound word (tatpurusha in Sanskrit) of chhatra (parasol or umbrella) and pati (master/lord/ruler). This title was used by the House of Bhonsle. 

The title "Chhatrapati" was created by Shivaji upon his coronation, and this was also held by his immediate successors, namely Sambhaji, Rajaram, and Shahu. After the death of Shahu, however, the increasing power of the Peshwas reduced his successors to a nominal position although they continue to use the title to this day.

The states of Satara and Kolhapur came into being in 1707, because of the succession dispute over the royalty. Shahuji, the heir apparent to the Maratha kingdom, captured by the Mughals at the age of nine, remained their prisoner at the death of his father Sambhaji, the elder son of Shivaji the founder of the Maratha Empire, in 1689. The dowager Maharani Tarabai (wife of Rajaram I) proclaimed her son Shivaji II, as Chhatrapati under her regency. The Mughals released Shahu under certain conditions in 1707, and he returned to claim his inheritance. He defeated the regent at the Battle of Khed and established himself at Satara, forcing her to retire with her son to Kolhapur. By 1710 two separate principalities had become an established fact. Shivaji II and Tarabai were  soon deposed by the other wife of Rajaram, Rajasbai. She installed her own son, Sambhaji II as the new ruler of Kolhapur. Sambhaji II signed the "Treaty of Warana" in 1731 with his cousin Shahuji to formalize the two separate seats of Bhonsle family.

Initial Chhatrapatis
This is the list of the initial Chhatrapatis.

Chhatrapatis of Satara
This is the list of the Chhatrapatis of Satara.

Chhatrapatis of Kolhapur
This is the list of the Chhatrapatis of Kolhapur.

See also
 House of Bhonsle
 Maratha Empire
 Maratha
 Maratha titles

Notes

References
  V.S. Kadam, 1993. Maratha Confederacy: A Study in its Origin and Development. Munshiram Manoharlal Publishers, New Delhi.
 D.B. Kasar, Rigveda to Rajgarh – Making of Shivaji the Great. Manudevi Prakashan, Mumbai.

Titles in India
Titles of national or ethnic leadership
Royal titles
Men's social titles
Hindu dynasties
Maratha Empire